In Enzymology, a dUTP diphosphatase is an enzyme that catalyzes the chemical reaction

dUTP + H2O  dUMP + diphosphate

Thus, the two substrates of this enzyme are dUTP and H2O, whereas its two products are dUMP and diphosphate.

This enzyme belongs to the family of hydrolases, specifically those acting on acid anhydrides in phosphorus-containing anhydrides.  The systematic name of this enzyme class is dUTP nucleotidohydrolase. Other names in common use include deoxyuridine-triphosphatase, dUTPase, dUTP pyrophosphatase, desoxyuridine 5'-triphosphate nucleotidohydrolase, and desoxyuridine 5'-triphosphatase.  This enzyme participates in pyrimidine metabolism.

This enzyme has a dual function: on one hand, it removes dUTP from the deoxynucleotide pool, which reduces the probability of this base being incorporated into DNA by DNA polymerases, while on the other hand, it produces the dTTP precursor dUMP. Lack or inhibition of dUTPase action leads to harmful perturbations in the nucleotide pool resulting in increased uracil content of DNA that activates a hyperactive futile cycle of DNA repair.

Structural studies

There are at least two structurally distinct families of dUTPases. The crystal structure of human dUTPase reveals that each subunit of the dUTPase trimer folds into an eight-stranded jelly-roll beta barrel, with the C-terminal beta strands interchanged among the subunits. The structure is similar to that of the Escherichia coli enzyme, despite low sequence homology between the two enzymes.

The second family has a novel all-alpha fold, members of this family are unrelated to the all-beta fold found in dUTPases of the majority of organisms.

See also
DUT, the gene that codes for this enzyme in humans
DnaS or dut, the gene that codes for this enzyme in E. coli

References

Further reading
 
 
 
 

EC 3.6.1
Enzymes of known structure